The Slovenian Individual Speedway Championship is a Motorcycle speedway championship held each year to determine the Slovenian national champion. It was first staged in 1978.

Matej Žagar holds the record, winning 18 championships.

Winners

See also
Slovenia national speedway team

References

Slovenia